Saskia Weishut-Snapper (born 5 August 1938 in Amsterdam) is a Dutch fiber artist.

Early life and family
Saskia grew up in the Netherlands, in Bergen, North Holland, a town with an art colony in which both her parents were active.

Saskia is married, has five sons, and lives in Amsterdam.

Career 
Weishut-Snapper turned to textile arts in 1970. Creating mixed media scenes somewhere between painting and quilting, she  refers to her works as 'peintisseries'. The subjects of her art are often textile landscapes, fantasy buildings, abstract compositions and themes based on Jewish tradition. She mostly exhibits in the Netherlands. She also showed her paintings in Belgium, Germany, Greece, Japan, Portugal, Sweden, Switzerland, the United Kingdom and the United States.

Works by Weishut-Snapper appear in art galleries, museums, churches and synagogues and were incorporated in art books. On her eightieth birthday, she featured on Dutch television, in a short documentary in the series 'Naches'.

References

External links 
 

1938 births
Living people
20th-century Dutch women artists
21st-century Dutch women artists
Artists from Amsterdam
Jewish artists
Dutch Jews
People from Bergen, North Holland